Jean (Baptiste) Cappus (Dijon, 6 October 1689 – 10 March 1751) was a French composer. The second name ‘Baptiste’ is attested only on his 1730 book of viol music.

Biography
Youngest son of François Cappus, organist, singer and composer in Dijon, and  Anne Hervelin, Jean Cappus married Marie-Michelle Dotée on 17 October 1729. The couple had two sons, Louis and Nicolas.

Career 
In 1734 Jean Cappus become director of the theatre in Dijon. He was  ‘Pensionnaire de la Ville de Dijon’ (resident (artist) for the city of
Dijon), ‘Maître Ordinaire de la Ville de Dijon’ (Ordinary Master for the city
of Dijon), and  musician for Louis Henri, Duke of Bourbon, prince of Condé (dit Louis IV, ou M. le Duc), governor of Burgundy (1710-1740). He also worked regularly   as a composer for the Jesuit College in Dijon for whom he composed music  for plays; only the text has survived, not the music. Jean Cappus rented the Hôtel de Barres in Dijon in 1734, which nowadays is the square Carrelet de Loizy. Here he directed many productions up to his death. An account of his conducting was given by Lantin Damerey in 1838 : ‘Rameau played the harpsichord, and Cappus directed the
orchestra with such vanity equal to a general of the army at the head of his
troops. His wife took over when it was needed’.

Works 
 Etrennes de musique contenant une méthode courte et facile pour apprendre cet art en très peu de temps, Paris, Lecler, Boivin, l'auteur, 1730. (Facsimile edition: Minkoff, 1989. Modern transcription Indiana University)
 Premier livre de pièces de viole et la basse continue, Paris, Boivin, Le Clerc, 1730. RISM A/1 C 927. (Facsimile on Gallica) 
 Premier recueil d'airs sérieux et à boire, Paris, Boivin, 1732 (lost)
 Second recueil d'airs sérieux et à boire, Paris, Boivin, 1732 (lost)
 Sémélé, ou La Naissance de Bacchus. Cantate à voix seule avec simphonie, Paris, Boivin, Le Clerc, Cappus, 1732. RISM A/1 C 925 (Facsimile on Gallica)
 Second livre de pièces de viole, Paris, Boivin, 1733 (lost)
 Air Ah! J'entends que la foudre gronde, "Mercure de France", [Paris], s.n., December 1734, vol. II, p. 2906 and following folio. RISM A/I C 926. (Facsimile on Gallica) 
For further vocal and instrumental compositions attributable to (Jean) Cappus, some published in collections, many lost, see J. Dunford and Y. Beuvard, Jean (-Baptiste) Cappus – the forgotten violist: an inventory of his life and works, The Viola da Gamba Society Journal, vol. 11 (2017), pp. 49–52.

Notes

References
Dunford, J., and Beuvard Y. (2017), "Jean (-Baptiste) Cappus – the forgotten violist: an inventory of his life and works", The Viola da Gamba Society Journal, vol. 11, pp. 46–64,

External links

Jean-Baptiste Cappus, Pièces de viole,  by Jonathan Dunford, Jérôme Chaboseau, Pierre Trocellier, © ℗ 2016 Jonathan Dunford

1751 deaths
1689 births
French Baroque composers
French male classical composers
Musicians from Dijon
18th-century classical composers
18th-century French male musicians
17th-century male musicians